Highland High School or Highlands High School may refer to:

In the United States:

Highland High School (Gilbert, Arizona)
Highland High School (Highland, Arkansas)
Highland High School (Bakersfield, California)
Highlands Academy of Arts & Design formerly known as Highlands High School (North Highlands, California)
Highland High School (Palmdale, California)
Highland High School (Ault, Colorado)

Highland High School (Craigmont, Idaho)
Highland High School (Pocatello, Idaho)
Highland High School (Highland, Illinois)
Highland High School (Anderson, Indiana)
Highland High School (Highland, Indiana)

Highlands High School (Fort Thomas, Kentucky)
Highland High School (Blackwood, New Jersey)
Highland High School (Albuquerque, New Mexico)
Highland High School (Highland, New York)
Highland High School (Medina County, Ohio)
Highland High School (Sparta, Ohio)
Highlands High School (Natrona Heights, Pennsylvania)
Highlands High School (San Antonio, Texas)
Highland High School (Utah)
Highland High School (Monterey, Virginia)
Highland High School (Cowiche, Washington)
Highland High School (Highland, Wisconsin)

It may also refer to:
Lake Highland Preparatory School, Orlando, Florida, USA
Highland Regional High School, Blackwood, New Jersey, USA
Lake Highlands High School, Dallas, Texas, USA
Northern Highlands Regional High School, Allendale, Bergen County, New Jersey, USA
Highland High School, a fictional school featured in the animated series Beavis and Butt-head

See also
Highland Junior High School (disambiguation)
Highland Park High School (disambiguation)
Highland Secondary School (disambiguation)